La Sagra Observatory (OLS; observatory code: L98) is an astronomical observatory located in the province of Granada, Spain. It uses four robotic telescopes both designed and built (hardware and software) by the scientists of the Observatorio Astronómico de Mallorca (OAM) who operate them remotely by telecontrol daily, discharging data from Mallorca using the Internet, to process them by means of algorithms designed "in house" which helped to detect asteroid 367943 Duende. among the other 1706 asteroids, with a 12th place in the ranking of asteroid discoveries. Its activities include, as part of its La Sagra Sky Survey, tracking small Solar System bodies, particularly near-Earth objects, and space debris.

Duende  

La Sagra Sky Survey 

The La Sagra Sky Survey (LSSS) was an astronomical survey conducted at La Sagra Observatory. The numbered comets 233P/La Sagra, 279P/La Sagra and 324P/La Sagra were discovered by LSSS.

See also 
 Miguel Hurtado

References

External links 
 Collados de la Sagra Web site
 Minor Planets.org

Astronomical observatories in Spain
Robotic telescopes
Buildings and structures in the Province of Granada